List of airports that Cape Air currently serves:

Former Destinations

References 

Cape Air